Monovalence or Monovalent may refer to:

Monovalent ion, an atom, ion, or chemical group with a valency of one, which thus can form one covalent bond
Monovalent vaccine, a vaccine directed at only one pathogen
Monovalent antibody, an antibody with affinity for one epitope, antigen, or strain of microorganism
 Monovalent verb or Intransitive verb, a verb that takes no direct object and has only one argument

See also
Valence (disambiguation)
Polyvalence (disambiguation)